Pieternella "Nel" Fritz (later Zandee; born 4 June 1937) is a retired Dutch gymnast. She competed at the 1960 Summer Olympics in all artistic gymnastics events and finished in 14th place with the Dutch team. Her best individual result was 68th place on the balance beam.

References

1937 births
Living people
Dutch female artistic gymnasts
Gymnasts at the 1960 Summer Olympics
Olympic gymnasts of the Netherlands
Sportspeople from Vlissingen